Robel (Tigrinya: ሮቤል) is a common male given name. It is a Ge'ez name meaning son of Jacob. It is commonly used in the countries of Eritrea or Ethiopia. It can be spelled as either Robel or Robell in Tigrinya. Notable people with the name include:

Given name

 Robel Fsiha (born 7 March 1996), Swedish long-distance runner of Eritrean origin
 Robel Haile (born 1998), Eritrean singer
 Robel Kiros Habte (born 1992), Ethiopian swimmer
 Robel Teklemariam (born 1974), Ethiopian cross-country skier
Robel Teklemichael
 Robel Asrat (born 1991), Eritrean-American Data Scientist. A Younger brother of Amanuel Asrat, a renowned Eritrean Poet and Journalist who has been jailed by the Eritrean government for twenty years and counting

See also
 
 Robel pole